Giacomo Amato (Palermo, 14 May 1643 – Palermo, 26 December 1732) was a Sicilian architect.

Member of the religious order of the Camillians and pupil of Paolo Amato and Carlo Rainaldi, he designed several scenographic Baroque churches in Palermo, like Santa Teresa alla Kalsa, Santa Maria della Pietà and San Mattia ai Crociferi. He also collaborated with Giacomo Serpotta in the designs of the Palermitan oratories of San Domenico and San Lorenzo.

External links 
 AMATO, Giacomo, Dizionario Biografico degli Italiani

Camillians
Architects of the Sicilian Baroque
Architects from Palermo
1643 births
1732 deaths